Powellville or Powellsville may refer to:
Powellville, California, former name of Blocksburg, California
Powellville, Maryland
Powellville, Missouri
Powellsville, North Carolina
Powellsville, Ohio